"Precious and Few" is a song recorded by American group Climax which became a major North American hit in early 1972.  The song was written by the band's guitarist, Walter D. Nims.

Background
Lead vocals on the demo were provided by Johnny McCurdy, also known as Johnny Mac

Background voices on Climax' hit record were arranged by Tom Bähler and sung by Jeanne Sheffield, Debbie Clinger, Mitch Gordon and Tom Bähler.

Chart performance
"Precious and Few" spent three weeks at number three on the U.S. Billboard Hot 100 and hit number one on the Cash Box Top 100. It also reached number six on Canada's RPM 100.

Weekly charts

Year-end charts

Cover versions
The song has been covered by several artists:
In 1972 by Andy Williams, the Lettermen, Ray Conniff and Terry Baxter
In 1973 by Pilita Corrales
In a Spanish version in 1995 by Barrio Boyzz titled "Entre tú y yo" 
In 1998 by the Company.

See also
 List of 1970s one-hit wonders in the United States
 List of Cash Box Top 100 number-one singles of 1972

References

External links
 Lyrics of this song
  

1971 songs
1971 debut singles
Climax (band) songs
Cashbox number-one singles